Eva Neymann (born 21 June 1974) is a Ukrainian film director. Her film At the River was entered into the 29th Moscow International Film Festival.

Selected filmography

Awards
 GoEast, Award of the Federal Foreign Office (At the River, 2007)
 Karlovy Vary International Film Festival, East of West Award (House with a Turret, 2012)
 Tallinn Black Nights Film Festival, Grand Prize (House with a Turret, 2012)
 International Istanbul Film Festival, People's Choice Award (House with a Turret, 2013)
 Karlovy Vary International Film Festival, Award of Ecumenical Jury - Special Mention (Song of Songs, 2012)
 Fribourg International Film Festival, FIPRESCI Prize (Song of Songs, 2016)
 Nashville Film Festival, Special Jury Prize (Song of Songs, 2016)
 Odessa International Film Festival Golden Duke (Song of Songs, 2016)

References

External links
 
 

1974 births
Living people
People from Zaporizhzhia
Ukrainian film directors
Ukrainian women film directors